Knefastia altenai is a species of sea snail, a marine gastropod mollusk in the family Pseudomelatomidae, the turrids and allies.

Description
The length of the shell attains 57.4 mm.

Distribution
This marine species occurs off Colombia.

References

 Macsotay, O. & Campos Villarroel, R., 2001. Moluscos representativos de la plataforma de Margarita – Venezuela – Descripción de 24 especies nuevas. Macsotay & Campos, Valencia, Venezuela. 280 pp.

External links
 Worldwide Mollusc Species Data Base: Knefastia altenai

altenai
Gastropods described in 2001